UDP glucuronosyltransferase 2 family, polypeptide B4, also known as UGT2B4, is an enzyme that in humans is encoded by the UGT2B4 gene.

Function 

UGT2B4 is mainly involved in the glucuronidation of hyodeoxycholic acid, a bile acid, and catechol-estrogens, such as 17-epiestriol and 4-hydroxy-estrone.

The expression of the UGT2B4 enzyme is upregulated by the farnesoid X receptor (FXR), a nuclear receptor which is activated by bile acids.  These same bile acids are substrates for the UGT2B4 enzyme.  Hence upregulation of UGT2B4 by activated FXR provides a mechanism for the detection, conjugation and subsequent elimination of toxic bile acids.

References

Further reading